Ante Aračić (born 28 September 1981, in Imotski) is a Croatian retired football defender.

Club career
He started his career with the local side Imotski before moving to Segesta and later Zmaj Makarska. He moved to Slavia Prague for the 2005–06 season and played with the club until August 2007, when he was sent off during UEFA Champions League qualifying match against Žilina. Since then, he played only for the Slavia reserve squad  and he was subsequently sold to Brussels. He was released in summer 2008 without participating in a single league match, and was signed up by Hajduk Split three months later, after a trial. The opportunities were scarce at Hajduk as well, but he managed to score in a match against Slaven Belupo. This turned out to be his last league match for Hajduk, as he was injured in a pre-season friendly against Blackburn Rovers, missing the larger part of the 2009–10 season and unable to get into the first team afterwards. He was released on a free transfer to Šibenik in August 2010.

References
HRsport.net profile 

1981 births
Living people
People from Imotski
Association football defenders
Croatian footballers
NK Zagreb players
HNK Segesta players
NK Imotski players
K.V. Oostende players
HŠK Posušje players
HNK Zmaj Makarska players
SK Slavia Prague players
R.W.D.M. Brussels F.C. players
HNK Hajduk Split players
HNK Šibenik players
NK Varaždin players
Croatian Football League players
First Football League (Croatia) players
Challenger Pro League players
Czech First League players
Croatian expatriate footballers
Expatriate footballers in Belgium
Croatian expatriate sportspeople in Belgium
Expatriate footballers in Bosnia and Herzegovina
Croatian expatriate sportspeople in Bosnia and Herzegovina
Expatriate footballers in the Czech Republic
Croatian expatriate sportspeople in the Czech Republic